Julian Theobald (born 11 November 1984 in Giessen) is a racing driver from Germany.

Career

Formula König
After a long karting career, Theobald stepped up to single-seaters in 2002, racing in the Formula König series in his native Germany. After finishing 23rd in his first season in the category, he improved to eleventh place the following year, finishing one point ahead of his younger brother, Johannes.

Formula Renault 2.0
2004 saw Theobald move up to the Formula Renault 2000 Germany series. In his eleven races in the championship, he scored 23 points to be classified in 28th position.

Formula Three
In 2005, Theobald graduated to Formula Three, racing in the German Formula Three Championship for the same SMS Seyffarth Junior Team as his brother Johannes. After starting the year with a Renault–powered Dallara F302, he switched to a Dallara F303–Mercedes after the fifth round at the Nürburgring. He finished the season just outside the championship's top ten in eleventh place, with the highlight being a fastest lap at the penultimate round at the Lausitzring.

For 2006, Theobald continued in Formula Three, this time moving to the Formula Three Euroseries. He was entered into the new Trophy Class for cars used between 2002 and 2004. Despite only taking part in half of the seasons' twenty races due to budget constraints, Theobald secured the Trophy Class title after the seventh round of the year at Zandvoort, taking six class wins from ten races in the process.

Formula Renault 3.5 Series
After testing for Pons Racing at the end of 2006, Theobald made his Formula Renault 3.5 Series debut at Donington Park in September 2007, replacing Jaap van Lagen at Eurointernational. Competing in the final eight races of the season, he failed to score any points, taking a best race result of 18th at both Donington and the season finale in Barcelona. At the penultimate round of the season in Estoril, Theobald was joined in the team by his brother Johannes for a one-off appearance.

Theobald made a return to the series in 2008, signing for British team Fortec Motorsport a few days before the opening round of the season at Monza. He completed the first four races of the season for the team at Monza and Spa-Francorchamps before being replaced by Fairuz Fauzy from the Monaco round onwards.

Formula Two
After missing the entire 2009 racing season, Theobald and his brother both took part in the FIA Formula Two Championship pre-event test held at Brands Hatch in July 2010, with Julian confirmed to take part in the Brands Hatch round of the 2010 season.

Racing record

Career summary

Complete Formula Renault 3.5 Series results
(key) (Races in bold indicate pole position) (Races in italics indicate fastest lap)

Complete FIA Formula Two Championship results
(key) (Races in bold indicate pole position; Races in italics indicate fastest lap)

References

External links
Official website 

1984 births
Living people
Sportspeople from Giessen
Racing drivers from Hesse
German racing drivers
German Formula Renault 2.0 drivers
German Formula Three Championship drivers
Formula 3 Euro Series drivers
FIA Formula Two Championship drivers
World Series Formula V8 3.5 drivers
EuroInternational drivers
Fortec Motorsport drivers